Jonah Malak (a.k.a. Karim Haroun), is a Canadian documentary filmmaker, producer and editor from Montreal, Canada. He is most noted for his 2020 film Dave Not Coming Back, for which he's received a Best Editing in a Documentary nomination at the 9th Canadian Screen Awards, 2021.

Early life and education
Jonah Malak was born in Beirut, Lebanon, during the Lebanese Civil War. After completing his Bachelor in Mathematics at the American University of Beirut, he moved to Montreal, Canada where he completed a double Bachelor in Arts in Film Studies and in Film Production.

He is a founding partner of the Canadian production company Nemesis Films, alongside Santiago Menghini and Dominique Dussault.

Career
Since founding Nemesis Films, Jonah Malak directed exclusively documentary films : Mystic Mass (Masse mystique), My Tuesdays at Catherine's (Mes mardis chez Catherine), and Dave Not Coming Back.

He had previously directed two short-films, June and Chronicles of Hyperinflation.

Malak is also a published writer, and his publications include Le Conte de la maison bête and Les Morts d'Omar.

Filmography

References

External links

Canadian documentary film directors
Canadian documentary film producers
Canadian film editors
Canadian people of Lebanese descent
Film directors from Montreal
Living people
1983 births